Capital punishment in Cambodia is prohibited by the Constitution of Cambodia. Cambodia abolished it in 1989.

Cambodia is one of only two ASEAN countries (the other being the Philippines) to have abolished capital punishment.

Legislation
The Constitution of the Kingdom of Cambodia (1993) at Art. 32 states: 
"All people have the right to life, freedom and personal security. There shall be no capital punishment."

Politics
In 1995, First Prime Minister Prince Norodom Ranariddh made calls for capital punishment by calling for murderers and drug traffickers to be killed by the State.

In 2019, Prime Minister Hun Sen said that he was considering introducing capital punishment for people who rape children, but he said it would only happen after a nationwide referendum. A couple days after this announcement, Hun Sen shifted his stance.

See also
 Capital punishment by country

References

Cambodia
Human rights abuses in Cambodia
1989 disestablishments in Cambodia